Bobby Marshall was an American sportsman.

Bobby Marshall may also refer to:

Bobby Marshall (footballer, born 1876) (1876–1931), Scottish footballer for Liverpool and Portsmouth
Bobby Marshall (footballer, born 1903) (1903–1966), footballer for Sunderland, Manchester City and Stockport County
Bobby Marshall (Home and Away), a character on Home and Away

See also
Bob Marshall (disambiguation)
Robert Marshall (disambiguation)